Woodlands Church is an evangelical church in Bristol, England. It is situated on the corner of Belgrave Road and Woodland Road, near the University of Bristol campus in Clifton.

Historic status 
Previously The Church of St Mary the Virgin, the building which was constructed in 1870-71 (see Grade II listed buildings in Bristol) has a Grade II listing by Historic England.

See also
 Churches in Bristol

External links
Official Woodlands Website

Churches in Clifton, Bristol
Grade II listed churches in Bristol
Churches completed in 1871